North Tyrone was a UK parliamentary constituency in Ireland. It returned one Member of Parliament (MP)  to the British House of Commons 1885–1918.

Prior to the 1885 United Kingdom general election the area was part of the Tyrone constituency. From the dissolution of Parliament in 1918 North Tyrone became part of the new North-West Tyrone constituency.

Notably, from 1895 until its abolition in 1918 the seat elected four Liberal MPs in succession by narrow margins; they were the only Liberals elected anywhere in Ireland during this time period, and remain the last MPs from a mainland party other than the Conservatives and their allies to represent a seat in the UK Parliament on the island of Ireland.

Boundaries
This constituency comprised the northern part of County Tyrone, consisting of the baronies of Strabane Lower and West Omagh, and that part of the barony of Strabane Upper consisting of the townlands of Aghalane, Ballynasollus, Bradkeel, Carnargan, Corickmore, Craigatuke, Cruckaclady, Dergbrough, Eden Back, Eden Fore, Eden Mill, Glencoppogagh, Glenga, Glashygolgan, Landahussy Lower, Landahussy Upper, Learden Lower, Learden Upper, Letterbrat, Lislea North, Lislea South, Lisnacreaght, Meenagarragh, Meenagorp, Tullagherin and Tullynadall in the parish of Upper Bodoney.

Members of Parliament

Elections

Elections in the 1880s

Elections in the 1890s

Elections in the 1900s

Elections in the 1910s

References

North Tyrone
Constituencies of the Parliament of the United Kingdom established in 1885
Constituencies of the Parliament of the United Kingdom disestablished in 1918